The Chicxulub crater is an impact crater buried underneath the Yucatán Peninsula in Mexico. Its center is offshore near the community of Chicxulub, after which it is named. It is the second largest confirmed impact structure on Earth, and the only one whose peak ring is intact and directly accessible for scientific research.

The crater was discovered by Antonio Camargo and Glen Penfield, geophysicists who had been looking for petroleum in the Yucatán Peninsula during the late 1970s. Penfield was initially unable to obtain evidence that the geological feature was a crater and gave up his search. Later, through contact with Alan R. Hildebrand in 1990, Penfield obtained samples that suggested it was an impact feature. Evidence for the crater's impact origin includes shocked quartz, a gravity anomaly, and tektites in surrounding areas.

The date of the impact coincides with the Cretaceous–Paleogene boundary (commonly known as the K–Pg or K–T boundary). It is now widely accepted that the resulting devastation and climate disruption was the cause of the Cretaceous–Paleogene extinction event, a mass extinction of 75% of plant and animal species on Earth, including all non-avian dinosaurs.

Discovery
In the late 1970s, geologist Walter Alvarez and his father, Nobel Prize-winning scientist Luis Walter Alvarez, put forth their theory that the Cretaceous–Paleogene extinction was caused by an impact event. The main evidence of such an impact was contained in a thin layer of clay present in the Cretaceous–Paleogene boundary (K–Pg boundary) in Gubbio, Italy. The Alvarezes and colleagues reported that it contained an abnormally high concentration of iridium, a chemical element rare on Earth but common in asteroids. Iridium levels in this layer were as much as 160 times above the background level. It was hypothesized that the iridium was spread into the atmosphere when the impactor was vaporized and settled across Earth's surface among other material thrown up by the impact, producing the layer of iridium-enriched clay. At the time, there was no consensus on what caused the Cretaceous–Paleogene extinction and the boundary layer, with theories including a nearby supernova, climate change, or a geomagnetic reversal. The Alvarezes' impact hypothesis was rejected by many paleontologists, who believed that the lack of fossils found close to the K–Pg boundary—the "three-meter problem"—suggested a more gradual die-off of fossil species.

The Alvarezes, joined by Frank Asaro and Helen Michel from University of California, Berkeley, published their paper on the iridium anomaly in Science in June 1980. Their paper was followed by other reports of similar iridium spikes at the K–Pg boundary across the globe, and sparked wide interest in the cause of the K–Pg extinction; over 2,000 papers were published in the 1980s on the topic. There were no known impact craters that were the right age and size, spurring a search for a suitable candidate. Recognizing the scope of the work, Lee Hunt and Lee Silver organized a cross-discipline meeting in Snowbird, Utah, in 1981. Unknown to them, evidence of the crater they were looking for was being presented the same week, and would be largely missed by the scientific community.

In 1978, geophysicists Glen Penfield and Antonio Camargo were working for the Mexican state-owned oil company Petróleos Mexicanos (Pemex) as part of an airborne magnetic survey of the Gulf of Mexico north of the Yucatán Peninsula. Penfield's job was to use geophysical data to scout possible locations for oil drilling. In the offshore magnetic data, Penfield noted anomalies whose depth he estimated and mapped. He then obtained onshore gravity data from the 1940s. When the gravity maps and magnetic anomalies were compared, Penfield described a shallow "bullseye",  in diameter, appearing on the otherwise non-magnetic and uniform surroundings—clear evidence to him of an impact feature. A decade earlier, the same map had suggested a crater to contractor Robert Baltosser, but Pemex corporate policy prevented him from publicizing his conclusion.

Penfield presented his findings to Pemex, who rejected the crater theory, instead deferring to findings that ascribed the feature to volcanic activity. Pemex disallowed release of specific data, but let Penfield and Camargo present the results at the 1981 Society of Exploration Geophysicists conference. That year's conference was under-attended and their report attracted scant attention, with many experts on impact craters and the K–Pg boundary attending the Snowbird conference instead. Carlos Byars, a Houston Chronicle journalist who was familiar with Penfield and had seen the gravitational and magnetic data himself, wrote a story on Penfield and Camargo's claim, but the news did not disseminate widely.

Although Penfield had plenty of geophysical data sets, he had no rock cores or other physical evidence of an impact. He knew Pemex had drilled exploratory wells in the region. In 1951, one bored into what was described as a thick layer of andesite about  down. This layer could have resulted from the intense heat and pressure of an Earth impact, but at the time of the borings it was dismissed as a lava dome—a feature uncharacteristic of the region's geology. Penfield was encouraged by William C. Phinney, curator of the lunar rocks at the Johnson Space Center, to find these samples to support his hypothesis. Penfield tried to secure site samples, but was told they had been lost or destroyed. When attempts to return to the drill sites to look for corroborating rocks proved fruitless, Penfield abandoned his search, published his findings and returned to his Pemex work. Seeing the 1980 Science paper, Penfield wrote to Walter Alvarez about the Yucatán structure, but received no response.

Alvarez and other scientists continued their search for the crater, although they were searching in oceans based on incorrect analysis of glassy spherules from the K–Pg boundary that suggested the impactor had landed in open water. Unaware of Penfield's discovery, University of Arizona graduate student Alan R. Hildebrand and faculty adviser William V. Boynton looked for a crater near the Brazos River in Texas. Their evidence included greenish-brown clay with surplus iridium, containing shocked quartz grains and small weathered glass beads that looked to be tektites. Thick, jumbled deposits of coarse rock fragments were also present, thought to have been scoured from one place and deposited elsewhere by an impact event. Such deposits occur in many locations but seemed concentrated in the Caribbean Basin at the K–Pg boundary. When Haitian professor Florentine Morás discovered what he thought to be evidence of an ancient volcano on Haiti, Hildebrand suggested it could be a telltale feature of a nearby impact. Tests on samples retrieved from the K–Pg boundary revealed more tektite glass, formed only in the heat of asteroid impacts and high-yield nuclear detonations.

In 1990, Carlos Byars told Hildebrand of Penfield's earlier discovery of a possible impact crater. Hildebrand contacted Penfield and the pair soon secured two drill samples from the Pemex wells, which had been stored in New Orleans for decades. Hildebrand's team tested the samples, which clearly showed shock-metamorphic materials. A team of California researchers surveying satellite images found a cenote (sinkhole) ring centered on the town of Chicxulub Puerto that matched the one Penfield saw earlier; the cenotes were thought to be caused by subsidence of bolide-weakened lithostratigraphy around the impact crater wall. Hildebrand, Penfield, Boynton, Camargo, and others published their paper identifying the crater in 1991. The crater was named for the nearby town of Chicxulub. Penfield also recalled that part of the motivation for the name was "to give the academics and NASA naysayers a challenging time pronouncing it" after years of dismissing its existence.

In March 2010, forty-one experts from many countries reviewed the available evidence: twenty years' worth of data spanning a variety of fields. They concluded that the impact at Chicxulub triggered the mass extinctions at the K–Pg boundary. Dissenters, notably Gerta Keller of Princeton University, have proposed an alternate culprit: the eruption of the Deccan Traps in what is now the Indian subcontinent. This period of intense volcanism occurred before and after the Chicxulub impact; dissenting studies argue that the worst of the volcanic activity occurred before the impact, and the role of the Deccan Traps was instead shaping the evolution of surviving species post-impact. A 2013 study compared isotopes in impact glass from the Chicxulub impact with isotopes in ash from the K–Pg boundary, concluding that they were dated almost exactly the same within experimental error.

Impact specifics
A 2013 study published in Science estimated the age of the impact as 66,043,000 ± 11,000 years ago (± 43,000 years ago considering systematic error), based on multiple lines of evidence, including argon–argon dating of tektites from Haiti and bentonite horizons overlying the impact horizon in northeastern Montana, United States. This date was supported by a 2015 study based on argon–argon dating of tephra found in lignite beds in the Hell Creek and overlying Fort Union formations in northeastern Montana. A 2018 study based on argon–argon dating of spherules from Gorgonilla Island, Colombia, obtained a slightly different result of 66,051,000 ± 31,000 years ago. The impact has been interpreted to have occurred in Northern Hemisphere spring based on annual isotope curves in sturgeon and paddlefish bones found in an ejecta-bearing sedimentary unit at the Tanis site in southwestern North Dakota. This sedimentary unit is thought to have formed within hours of impact. A 2020 study concluded that the Chicxulub crater was formed by an inclined (45–60° to horizontal) impact from the northeast. The site of the crater at the time of impact was a marine carbonate platform.

There is broad consensus that the Chicxulub impactor was an asteroid with a carbonaceous chondrite composition, rather than a comet. In 1998, a  meteorite was described from the North Pacific from sediments spanning the Cretaceous–Paleogene boundary; it was suggested to represent a fragment of the Chicxulub impactor. Analysis suggested that it best fitted the criteria of the CV, CO and CR groups of carbonaceous chondrites. A 2021 paper suggested, based on geochemical evidence including the excess of chromium isotope 54Cr and the ratios of platinum group metals found in marine impact layers, that the impactor was either a CM or CR carbonaceous chondrite C-type asteroid.

Effects

The impact triggered a seismic event with an estimated magnitude of 9–11  at the impact site.

A cloud of hot dust, ash and steam would have spread from the crater, with as much as 25 trillion metric tons of excavated material being ejected into the atmosphere by the blast. Some of this material escaped orbit, dispersing throughout the Solar System, while some of it fell back to Earth, heated to incandescence upon re-entry. The rock heated Earth's surface and ignited wildfires, estimated to have enveloped nearly 70% of the planet's forests. The devastation to living creatures even hundreds of kilometers away was immense, and much of present-day Mexico and the United States would have been devastated. Field research from the Hell Creek Formation in North Dakota published in 2019 shows the simultaneous mass extinction of myriad species combined with geological and atmospheric features consistent with the impact event.

Due to the relatively shallow water, the rock that was vaporized included sulfur-rich gypsum from the lower part of the Cretaceous sequence, and this was injected into the atmosphere. This global dispersal of dust and sulfates would have led to a sudden and catastrophic effect on the climate worldwide, instigating large temperature drops and devastating the food chain. The researchers stated that the impact generated an environmental calamity that extinguished life, but it also induced a vast subsurface hydrothermal system that became an oasis for the recovery of life. Researchers using seismic images of the crater in 2008 determined that the impactor landed in deeper water than previously assumed, which may have resulted in increased sulfate aerosols in the atmosphere, due to more water vapor being available to react with the vaporized anhydrite. This could have made the impact even deadlier by cooling the climate and generating acid rain.

The emission of dust and particles could have covered the entire surface of Earth for several years, possibly a decade, creating a harsh environment for living things. Production of carbon dioxide caused by the destruction of carbonate rocks would have led to a sudden greenhouse effect. For over a decade or longer, sunlight would have been blocked from reaching the surface of Earth by the dust particles in the atmosphere, cooling the surface dramatically. Photosynthesis by plants would also have been interrupted, affecting the entire food chain. A model of the event developed by Lomax et al (2001) suggests that net primary productivity rates may have increased to higher than pre-impact levels over the long term because of the high carbon dioxide concentrations.

A long-term local effect of the impact was the creation of the Yucatán sedimentary basin which "ultimately produced favorable conditions for human settlement in a region where surface water is scarce".

Post-discovery investigations

Geophysical data
Two seismic reflection datasets have been acquired over the offshore parts of the crater since its discovery. Older 2D seismic datasets have also been used that were originally acquired for hydrocarbon exploration. The longest of the lines, Chicx-A, was shot parallel to the coast, while Chicx-B and Chicx-C were shot NW–SE and SSW–NNE respectively. In addition to the conventional seismic reflection imaging, data was recorded onshore to allow wide-angle refraction imaging.

This survey also used ocean bottom seismometers and land stations to allow 3D travel time inversion to improve the understanding of the velocity structure of the crater. The data was concentrated around the interpreted offshore peak ring to help identify possible drilling locations. At the same time, gravity data were acquired along  of profiles. The acquisition was funded by the National Science Foundation (NSF), Natural Environment Research Council (NERC) with logistical assistance from the National Autonomous University of Mexico (UNAM) and the Centro de Investigación Científica de Yucatán (CICY – Yucatán Center for Scientific Investigation).

Borehole drilling
Intermittent core samples from hydrocarbon exploration boreholes drilled by Pemex on the Yucatán peninsula have provided some useful data. UNAM drilled a series of eight fully-cored boreholes in 1995, three of which penetrated deeply enough to reach the ejecta deposits outside the main crater rim, UNAM-5, 6 and 7. The borehole was cored continuously, passing through  of impactites. Three fully-cored boreholes were also drilled by the Comisión Federal de Electricidad (Federal Electricity Commission) with UNAM. One of them, (BEV-4), was deep enough to reach the ejecta deposits.

In 2016, a joint United Kingdom–United States team obtained the first offshore core samples, from the peak ring in the central zone of the crater with the drilling of the borehole known as M0077A, part of Expedition 364 of the International Ocean Discovery Program.

Morphology

The form and structure (morphology) of the Chicxulub crater is known mainly from geophysical data. It has a well-defined concentric multi-ring structure. The outermost ring was identified using seismic reflection data. This makes it one of the three largest impact structures on Earth. Moving into the center, the next ring is the main crater rim, also known as the "inner rim" which correlates with ring of cenotes onshore and a major circular Bouguer gravity gradient anomaly. The next ring structure, moving inwards, is the peak ring. The area between the inner rim and peak ring is described as the "terrace zone", characterized by a series of fault blocks defined by normal faults dipping towards the crater center, sometimes referred to as "slump blocks". The central part of the crater lies above a zone where the mantle was uplifted such that the Moho is shallower by about  compared to regional values.

The ring structures are best developed to the south, west and northwest, becoming more indistinct towards the north and northeast of the structure.

Geology

Pre-impact geology

Before the impact, the geology of the Yucatán area, sometimes referred to as the "target rocks", consisted of a sequence of mainly Cretaceous limestones, overlying red beds of uncertain age above an unconformity with the dominantly granitic basement. The basement forms part of the Maya Block and information about its makeup and age in the Yucatán area has come only from drilling results around the Chicxulub crater and the analysis of basement material found as part of the ejecta at more distant K–Pg boundary sites. The Maya block is one of a group of crustal blocks found at the edge of the Gondwana continent. Zircon ages are consistent with the presence of an underlying Grenville age crust, with large amounts of late Ediacaran arc-related igneous rocks, interpreted to have formed in the Pan-African orogeny. Late Paleozoic granitoids (the distinctive "pink granite") were found in the peak ring borehole M0077A, with an estimated age of 326 ± 5 million years ago (Carboniferous). These have an adakitic composition and are interpreted to represent the effects of slab detachment during the Marathon-Ouachita orogeny, part of the collision between Laurentia and Gondwana that created the Pangaea supercontinent.

These continental clastic rocks are thought to be of Triassic-to-Jurassic age, although they may extend into the Lower Cretaceous. The lower part of the Lower Cretaceous sequence consists of dolomite with interbedded anhydrite and gypsum, with the upper part being limestone, with dolomite and anhydrite in part. The Upper Cretaceous sequence is mainly platform limestone, with marl and interbedded anhydrite. There is evidence for a Cretaceous basin within the Yucatán area that has been named the Yucatán Trough, running approximately south–north, widening northwards, explaining the observed thickness variations.

Impact rocks
The most common observed impact rocks are suevites, found in many of the boreholes drilled around the Chicxulub crater. Most of the suevites were resedimented soon after the impact by the resurgence of oceanic water into the crater. This gave rise to a layer of suevite extending from the inner part of the crater out as far as the outer rim.

The samples of melt rock that have been studied have overall compositions similar to that of the basement rocks, with some indications of mixing with carbonate source, presumed to be derived from the Cretaceous carbonates. An analysis of melt rocks sampled by the M0077A borehole indicates two types of melt rock, an upper impact melt (UIM), which has a clear carbonate component as shown by its overall chemistry and the presence of rare limestone clasts and a lower impact melt-bearing unit (LIMB) that lacks any carbonate component. The difference between the two impact melts is interpreted to be a result of the upper part of the initial impact melt, represented by the LIMB in the borehole, becoming mixed with materials from the shallow part of the crust either falling back into the crater or being brought back by the resurgence forming the UIM.

The "pink granite", a granitoid rich in alkali feldspar found in the peak ring borehole shows many deformation features that record the extreme strains associated with the formation of the crater and the subsequent development of the peak ring. The granitoid has an unusually low density and P-wave velocity compared to typical granitic basement rocks. Study of the core from M0077A shows the following deformation features in apparent order of development: pervasive fracturing along and through grain boundaries, a high density of shear faults, bands of cataclasite and ultra-cataclasite and some ductile shear structures. This deformation sequence is interpreted to result from initial crater formation involving acoustic fluidization followed by shear faulting with the development of cataclasites with fault zones containing impact melts.

These hydrothermal systems may provide support for the impact origin of life hypothesis for the Hadean eon, when the entire surface of Earth was affected by impactors much larger than the Chicxulub impactor.

Post-impact geology
After the immediate effects of the impact had stopped, sedimentation in the Chicxulub area returned to the shallow water platform carbonate depositional environment that characterised it before the impact. The K–Pg boundary inside the crater is significantly deeper than in the surrounding area.

On the Yucatán peninsula, the inner rim of the crater is marked by clusters of cenotes, which are the surface expression of a zone of preferential groundwater flow, moving water from a recharge zone in the south to the coast through a karstic aquifer system. From the cenote locations, the karstic aquifer is clearly related to the underlying crater rim, possibly through higher levels of fracturing,
caused by differential compaction.

Astronomical origin of impactor
In September 2007, a report published in Nature proposed an origin for the asteroid that created the Chicxulub crater. The authors, William F. Bottke, David Vokrouhlický, and David Nesvorný, argued that a collision in the asteroid belt 160 million years ago between a 170 km (106 mi) diameter parent body and another 60 km (37 mi) diameter body, resulted in the Baptistina family of asteroids, the largest surviving member of which is 298 Baptistina. They proposed that the "Chicxulub asteroid" was also a member of this group.

The Baptistina family was subsequently considered an unlikely source of the Chicxulub asteroid because a spectrographic analysis published in 2009 revealed that 298 Baptistina has a different composition more typical of an S-type asteroid than the presumed carbonaceous chondrite composition of the Chicxulub impactor. In 2011, data from the Wide-field Infrared Survey Explorer revised the date of the collision which created the Baptistina family to about 80 million years ago. This made an asteroid from this family highly improbable to be the asteroid that created the Chicxulub crater, as typically the process of resonance and collision of an asteroid takes many tens of millions of years. In 2010, another hypothesis implicated the newly discovered asteroid 354P/LINEAR, a member of the Flora family of asteroids, as a possible remnant cohort of the K–Pg impactor. In July 2021, a study reported that the impactor likely originated in the outer main part of the asteroid belt, based on numerical simulations.

Two papers published in 1984 proposed the impactor to be a comet originating from the Oort cloud, and it was proposed in 1992 that tidal disruption of comets could potentially increase impact rates. In February 2021, four independent laboratories reported elevated concentrations of iridium in the crater's peak ring, further corroborating the asteroid impact hypothesis. In the same month, Avi Loeb and a colleague published a study in Scientific Reports suggesting the impactor was a fragment from a disrupted comet, rather than an asteroid—the long-standing leading candidate among scientists. This was followed by a rebuttal published in Astronomy & Geophysics that June, which charged that the paper ignored the fact that the mass of iridium deposited across the globe by the impact (estimated to be approximately 2.0–2.8 × 10 grams), was too large to be created by a comet impactor the size required to create the crater, and that Loeb et al. had overestimated likely comet impact rates. They found that an asteroid impactor was strongly favored by all available evidence, and that a comet impactor could be effectively ruled out.

See also 
 Barberton Greenstone Belt
 List of impact craters on Earth
 List of possible impact structures on Earth
 Nadir crater
 Permian–Triassic extinction event
 Timeline of Cretaceous–Paleogene extinction event research

References

External links 

 Chicxulub Crater
 Chicxulub: Variations in the magnitude of the gravity field at sea level image (Lunar and Planetary Institute, USRA)
 "Doubts on Dinosaurs" – Scientific American
 Papers and presentations resulting from the 2016 Chicxulub drilling project

 
Cretaceous impact craters
Extinction events
Impact craters of Mexico
Mérida, Yucatán
Natural history of the Caribbean
Natural history of the Yucatán Peninsula
Oceans
Prehistoric dinosaurs